Memoirs v. Massachusetts, 383 U.S. 413 (1966), was the United States Supreme Court decision that attempted to clarify a holding regarding obscenity made a decade earlier in Roth v. United States (1957).  

Since the Roth ruling, to be declared obscene a work of literature had to be proven by censors to: 1) appeal to prurient interest, 2) be patently offensive, and 3) have no redeeming social value.  The book in question in this case was Fanny Hill (or Memoirs of a Woman of Pleasure, 1749) by John Cleland and the Court held in Memoirs v. Massachusetts that, while it might fit the first two criteria (it appealed to prurient interest and was patently offensive), it could not be proven that Fanny Hill had no redeeming social value.  The judgment favoring the plaintiff continued that it could still be held obscene under certain circumstances for instance, if it were marketed solely for its prurient appeal.  

Memoirs v. Massachusetts led to more years of debate about what was and was not obscene and the conferring of more power in these matters to proposers of local community standards.

See also
 Banned in Boston
 List of United States Supreme Court cases, volume 383

Further reading

References

External links

United States Supreme Court cases
United States obscenity case law
1966 in United States case law
United States in rem cases
United States Supreme Court cases of the Warren Court